The events of 1961 in anime.

Releases

Births
 July 19 - Noriyuki Abe, director, storyboard artist, sound director
 November 21 - Takami Akai, character designer, animator

Deaths
 July 28: Noburō Ōfuji, Japanese director and animator dies at age 61.

See also
1961 in animation

External links 
Japanese animated works of the year, listed in the IMDb

Anime
Anime
Years in anime